Eddie Ng Hak-kim GBS, JP (born c. 1953) is a former Secretary for Education in the Hong Kong Government. From 2017, he is a temporary adjunct professor at the MBA Centre of Shanghai University.

Background
In 1977, Ng began his career at the Hong Kong Council of Social Service co-ordinating non-governmental organisations.  Since then, he has taken human resource management positions at multiple corporations including Motorola, Citibank, AT&T, Lucent, Jardine Fleming, JPMorgan Chase, and Macquarie Group.

In 2006, he began serving as member of the Hong Kong Examinations and Assessment Authority council and chairman of the human resources committee.
By 2009, Ng became Chairman of the Hong Kong Examinations and Assessment Authority. He was later appointed as Secretary for Education of Hong Kong in July 2012.

Controversy
In 2012, the government of Hong Kong attempted to introduce a new curriculum known as Moral and National Education. It was not well received by the residents of Hong Kong and was eventually shelved indefinitely. One of the reasons why it was turned down was because it was found that the "China Model National Conditions Teaching Manual", published by the National Education Services Centre under government fundings, was found to be biased towards the Communist Party of China and the so-called "China model". The teaching manual called the Communist Party an "advanced, selfless and united ruling group" (進步、無私與團結的執政集團), while denouncing Democratic and Republican Parties of the United States as a "fierce interparty rivalry [that] makes the people suffer" (政黨惡鬥，人民當災). The minister for Education Eddie Ng defended that even though the teaching manual is biased, the subject should not be valued more broadly.

Honours
In 2004, Ng was appointed Justice of the Peace (JP) for Hong Kong.  Ng is also a fellow member of the Hong Kong Institute of Human Resource Management (HKIHRM), Hong Kong Institute of Directors (HKIoD) and Hong Kong Management Association. He is also adjunct professor at the Business School of the Hong Kong Baptist University, and Honourable Professor at the MBA School of the Shanghai University.

References

External links
HK Secretary for Education Eddie Ng visits BNU-HKBU United International College- 14 May 2015

Education in Hong Kong
Government officials of Hong Kong
Hong Kong civil servants
Recipients of the Silver Bauhinia Star
Recipients of the Gold Bauhinia Star
1953 births
Living people